Kirbya is a genus of bristle flies in the family Tachinidae. There are about five described species in Kirbya.

Subgenera & Species
Subgenus Coleophasia Townsend, 1931
Kirbya pacifica (Curran, 1927)
Subgenus Hesperophasia Townsend, 1915
Kirbya aenescens (Curran, 1927)
Kirbya setosa (Townsend, 1915)
Subgenus Hesperophasiopsis Townsend, 1915
Kirbya aldrichi (Curran, 1927)
Kirbya californica (Townsend, 1915)
Kirbya nigripennis (Curran, 1927)
Subgenus Kirbya Townsend, 1915
Kirbya moerens (Meigen, 1830)
Kirbya unicolor Villeneuve, 1927
Unplaced to subgenus
Kirbya turkmenica Richter, 1995

References

Diptera of Europe
Diptera of North America
Diptera of Asia
Dexiinae
Tachinidae genera
Taxa named by Jean-Baptiste Robineau-Desvoidy